Phyllis Edith Mary Blythe (13 February 1912 – 31 October 2001), known professionally as Jenny Laird, was a British stage, film and television actress.

Early life and education
Born in Manchester, Laird and her parents moved to the south, and she was educated at Maidstone grammar school and London University. She worked briefly as an advertising copywriter while studying acting with teachers such as the Central School's legendary Elsie Fogerty and in 1937 she made her repertory debut at the Brixton Theatre in A Bill of Divorcement.

Theatre
Laird worked with director Alec Clunes at the Arts Theatre Club during its heyday in the 1940s and 1950s. What the actor-manager sought for the little underground playhouse in London's Great Newport Street was an audience "eager for intelligent and entertaining plays". Laird's acting went from strength to strength in Farquhar, Ibsen, Chekhov, Shaw and other modern plays. While at the Arts Theatre, she periodically returned to "commercial" theatre, playing Rose in The Recruiting Officer (1943) and Nora in A Doll's House (1945). As Ellie, in the revival by Californian John Fernald (whom Laird married in 1947) of Shaw's Heartbreak House (1950), she revealed, one critic wrote, "an enchanting combination of youth and firmness. Her broken heart never ceased to glint through her mask of ice". Her shapely legs and green eyes figured prominently in West End plays by Ivor Novello, N. C. Hunter and Robert Morley.

Writing
With her husband, she co-wrote the West End comedy And No Birds Sing, adapted several plays from the French, and in 1977 wrote Mixed Economy, which played at the King's Head Theatre in Islington, starring Margaret Rawlings and Laird's daughter Karen Fernald.

Personal life
In 1947, Laird married her collaborator John Fernald; they had one daughter, Karen.

Selected filmography
 The Morals of Marcus (1935) - Maid (uncredited)
 Auld Lang Syne (1937) - Alison Begbie
 The Last Chance (1937) - Betty
 Passenger to London (1937) - Barbara Lane
 What a Man! (1938) - Daisy Pennyfeather
 Lily of Laguna (1938) - Jane Marshall
 Black Eyes (1939) - Lucy
 Just William (1940) - Ethel Brown
 The Lamp Still Burns (1943) - Ginger Watkins
 Painted Boats (1945) - Mary Smith
 Beware of Pity (1946) - Trudi
 Wanted for Murder (1946) - Jeannie McLaren
 Black Narcissus (1947) - Sister Honey
 Your Witness (1950) - Mary Baxter, Sam's Wife
 The Long Dark Hall (1951) - Mrs. Sims
 Life in Her Hands (1951) - Matron
 Gilbert Harding Speaking of Murder (1953) - Linda Maxwell
 Face in the Night (1957) - Postman's Widow
 Conspiracy of Hearts (1960) - Sister Honoria
 Village of the Damned (1960) - Mrs. Harrington
 The Masks of Death (1984) - Mrs. Hudson (U.S TV movie)

Television
 The Onedin Line (1972) (3 episodes)
 Doctor Who (1974) (Planet of the Spiders)
 Shoulder to Shoulder (1974) - Matron of Holloway Prison (Lady Constance Lytton)
 Secret_Army_(TV_series) (1974) - Little Old Lady (Else Lambrichts)

 Lillie (1978) (The Jersey Lily)
 All Creatures Great and Small (1988) (Barks and Bites)
 Inspector Morse (1991) (Second Time Around) (final screen role)

References

External links

1912 births
2001 deaths
English stage actresses
English film actresses
English television actresses
Actresses from Manchester